In the context of a module M over a ring R, the top of M is the largest semisimple quotient module of M if it exists. 

For finite-dimensional k-algebras (k a field) R, if rad(M) denotes the intersection of all proper maximal submodules of M (the radical of the module), then the top of M is M/rad(M).  In the case of local rings with maximal ideal P, the top of M is M/PM.  In general if R is a semilocal ring (=semi-artinian ring), that is, if R/Rad(R) is an Artinian ring, where Rad(R) is the Jacobson radical of R, then M/rad(M) is a semisimple module and is the top of M.  This includes the cases of local rings and finite dimensional algebras over fields.

See also
Projective cover
Radical of a module
Socle (mathematics)

References
 David Eisenbud, Commutative algebra with a view toward Algebraic Geometry 

Commutative algebra
Module theory